Hinduism is a minority faith in Barbados, followed by 0.46% of its population.

Demographics
Hindus constituted 0.24% of the population of Barbados in 1990, which increased to 0.34% in 2000. It then slightly increased to 0.46% in 2010 census.

Most of the Hindus in Barbados lives in the Saint Michael and Christ Church. Although East Indians constitute 1.3% of the population of Barbados, only 0.46% of Barbadians are Hindus.

Contemporary society
Hindus in Barbados comprises mainly the community of just 80 Sindhi families. Every one of them has a home shrine. For many years the Sindhis kept Hinduism alive solely through their private shrines at home, which paid tribute to every Hindu deity, to the Bhagavad Gita and the Guru Granth Sahib, too. A majority of Hindus in Barbados are followers of Maharaj Charansinghji of Beas (a district of Amritsar in the Punjab), Sri Satya Sai Baba or Sadhu Vaswani. It is a community of many vegetarians and teetotalers.

There is a Hindu temple in St Michael in Welches. Hindus in Barbados celebrate Hindu festivals like Holi or Phagwah.

See also
Hinduism in Panama
Hinduism in Jamaica

References

Hinduism in Barbados
Indo-Caribbean religion